Agu Casmir (born 23 March 1984 in Lagos, Nigeria) is a retired professional football player. Born in Nigeria, he represented the Singapore national team.

Club career
Casmir previously played for S.League clubs Young Lions and Woodlands Wellington FC in Singapore's S.League,

Casmir burst onto the football scene with Woodlands Wellington FC in 2002, scoring a remarkable 27 goals as an 18-year-old. He followed that up with another 15 goals the next year. In 2004 and 2005, playing for Young Lions, he scored a total of 31 goals. He returned to Woodlands Wellington FC last year and scored 17 times, before joining Gombak United FC at the start of the current 2007 S.League season.

In 2006, it was reported that Casmir signed a contract with Indonesian football club Persija Jakarta and that he took a signing-on fee of US$20,000. However, he did not at Persija Jakarta on 17 January, claiming to be attending football trials with a Russian club and the club subsequently sought repayment of the fee from his agent, ex-footballer Jules Onana. It was subsequently reported that Casmir had left his residence in Toa Payoh with his belongings on 19 January.

It was consequently reported on 19 February 2006 in The Straits Times that Casmir had purportedly been in Canada and had no intention of further pursuing a career in football. The report quoted Casmir's ex-manager, R. Vengadasalam, as saying that Casmir was disillusioned with football and had no intention of returning to Singapore. He had taken the contract to prove that he could still command a large annual fee (reported at US$80,000).

After a few weeks, reports emerged that Casmir wanted to return to playing football in Singapore. Several football clubs including Gombak United FC had expressed interest in inviting him to play for their team, before he re-signed for former club Woodlands Wellington FC on a one-year contract, under a deal in which the club would re-pay Persija Jakarta his signing-on fee. The Football Association of Singapore suspended Casmir from the national squad for a year and fined him S$20,000 for his actions involving Persija Jakarta.

On 19 September 2007, Casmir's 86th-minute goal for the Gombak United FC, which cancelled out Home United FC Kone Hamed's 18th-minute opener, was his 100th in the S.League.

At the end of the 2007, Gombak United decided not to renew Casmir's contract. Nevertheless, when the FIFA World Cup 2010 qualifier game against Lebanon loomed, he trained with one of his former clubs, Young Lions, to keep his fitness at peak condition to be eligible for a call-up to the national team.

Casmir did not play for the large part of 2008 due to being clubless, but in August 2008, Malaysian club PDRM FA signed him together with Noh Alam Shah. Controversially, he was released after just 3 games, without any goals to his name. Gombak United again re-signed him in 2009.

Casmir spent the 2011 season playing for Persija Jakarta in the Indonesian Super League. On 5 December 2011, it was announced that he would be joining the Singapore LIONSXII team that would be returning to the Malaysian Super League for the 2012 season.

Not retained on the LionsXII squad for 2013, Casmir was left without a club for a year until he signed with Indonesian club Persebaya Bhayangkara at the end of 2013. In June 2014, he signed with S.League Warriors FC, taking jersey number 22.

International career
Born in Nigeria, Casmir was offered Singapore citizenship via the Foreign Sports Talent Scheme in 2004. He was a member of the Singapore national team, which won the Tiger Cup regional football championship in 2005.

Casmir was part of the national football team for the 2005 Southeast Asian Games (SEA Games) held at the Philippines. Singapore failed to advance beyond the group stage with Casmir failing to score a goal. He was also part of the team for the 2007 SEA Games where Singapore won the bronze medal.

Casmir's impressive displays in the tail-end of 2008 earned him a national call-up for the 2008 Suzuki Cup. He scored a last-minute goal for Singapore against Myanmar to allow Singapore to earn three points at the 2010 Suzuki Cup, but they were still unable to progress to the next round.

National team career statistics

Goals for senior national team

Honours

Club
Gombak United
Singapore League Cup: 2008

International
Singapore
ASEAN Football Championship: 2004
Southeast Asian Games: Bronze Medal – 2007

Individual
100 S.League Goals: 2007

References

External links
 

1984 births
Living people
Sportspeople from Lagos
Singaporean footballers
Singapore international footballers
Nigerian footballers
Singaporean people of Nigerian descent
Nigerian emigrants to Singapore
Naturalised citizens of Singapore
Gombak United FC players
Woodlands Wellington FC players
Warriors FC players
Singapore Premier League players
Expatriate footballers in Indonesia
Singaporean expatriate footballers
Singaporean expatriate sportspeople in Indonesia
Persija Jakarta players
Persebaya Surabaya players
Liga 1 (Indonesia) players
Expatriate footballers in Malaysia
Singaporean expatriate sportspeople in Malaysia
PDRM FA players
LionsXII players
Malaysia Super League players
Association football forwards
Young Lions FC players
Southeast Asian Games bronze medalists for Singapore
Southeast Asian Games medalists in football
Competitors at the 2007 Southeast Asian Games